Charles Bartlett Andrews (November 4, 1834 – September 12, 1902) was an American politician and the 49th Governor of Connecticut.

Biography
Andrews  was born in Sunderland, Massachusetts on November 4, 1834. He graduated from Amherst College in 1858. He then moved to the state of Connecticut and studied law. In 1861 he was admitted to the bar. He was married twice; to Mary J. Carter and to Sarah M. Wilson. He had one child.

Career
In 1863 he moved to Litchfield, and became the partner of John H. Hubbard, then in large practice; here he at once took a prominent position at the bar, advancing rapidly till he became its leader.

In 1868 Andrews became a member of the Connecticut State Senate from Litchfield County.  In 1878, however, he accepted the nomination for representative from Litchfield in the Connecticut House of Representatives. At the following election he was elected and enjoyed the distinction of being the first Republican to hold that office since the American Civil War. In this session he was chairman of the Judiciary Committee and leader of the House.

Later in the same year, 1878, Andrews was elected the Governor of Connecticut by a legislative vote, and served from January 9, 1879 to January 5, 1881. During his term, the governor's office was granted the power to recommend judges for the State Supreme Court and a resolution passed that ended an ongoing boundary line dispute. A bill was constituted that established the incorporation of joint-stock companies and a progressive jury law was formed.

Andrews left the office on January 5, 1881, and continued his law practice. Appointed to the bench of the Connecticut Superior Court in 1881, he served as chief justice from 1889 to 1901. He also was a delegate and presiding officer to the 1902 Constitutional Convention.

Death
Andrews died on September 12, 1902 (age 67 years, 312 days). He is interred at East Cemetery, Litchfield, Connecticut.

References

External links
 Sobel, Robert and John Raimo. Biographical Directory of the Governors of the United States, 1789-1978. Greenwood Press, 1988. 
The Political Graveyard
Connecticut State Library

The Governors of Connecticut

1834 births
1902 deaths
Amherst College alumni
Republican Party governors of Connecticut
Chief Justices of the Connecticut Supreme Court
Republican Party Connecticut state senators
Republican Party members of the Connecticut House of Representatives
19th-century American politicians
19th-century American judges